The Daniel Boone Bridge is the name for two bridges carrying Interstate 64, U.S. Route 40 and U.S. Route 61 across the Missouri River between St. Louis County and St. Charles County, Missouri. The older bridge, which carries westbound traffic, is a continuous truss bridge, while the newer bridge, which carries eastbound traffic, is a deck girder bridge.

1937 Bridge

In December, 1935 it was announced that the Kansas City Bridge Company was the lowest bidder (at $1.2 million) for the construction of a bridge across the Missouri River at Weldon Spring, Missouri.  It was financed as a Public Works Administration project, with the Federal agency contributing 30% of the cost and the State of Missouri 70%. The bridge connected a roadway (originally designated as Relief Highway No. 40) that began at the junction of U.S. Highway 40 and U.S. Highway 61 in Wentzville, Missouri to Olive Street Road in western St. Louis County. Work on the bridge commenced in February, 1936 and was completed by June, 1937. Missouri Governor Lloyd C. Stark participated in the dedication of the bridge and roadway on Saturday June 26, 1937. The final cost of the project was $1.35 million. The bridge was 30 feet wide and provided an alternate route for the heavily congested old St. Charles Bridge that carried U.S. Highway 40 through St. Charles, Missouri into St. Louis.

Initially serving both directions of travel (one in each direction) it was restriped for three lanes total, with the middle lane being a signal-controlled reversible lane. Following the opening of a parallel span in 1989, the bridge was rehabilitated, then converted to serve two lanes of westbound traffic while the new bridge served eastbound traffic. In 2001, MoDOT again striped the bridge back to three lanes to add an extra westbound lane.  As the AADT rapidly increased, there came to be an increasing need for a wider bridge with standard-width lanes and shoulders, both of which the original bridge lacked. Furthermore, the aging structure had reached the point in life where regular maintenance was required, which not only was a money drain to the state, but was also an inconvenience to motorists due to the lane closures needed to safely make the repairs. As a result, MoDOT started planning for a new replacement in the early 2000s. Traffic across the old bridge ceased on November 5, 2015 after the former eastbound span opened to westbound traffic. Although the bridge was eligible for the NRHP list, it was demolished in March 2016.

1989 Bridge

MoDOT opened an additional bridge upstream of the original span, as a result of increased congestion. The bridge was initially built for two eastbound lanes, however the shoulders were converted to travel lanes in 2001, for a total of four lanes. The bridge closed on June 28, 2015 to be rehabilitated. The work was completed on November 5, 2015, on which day the bridge opened to westbound traffic.

2015 Bridge

As a result of the narrow lanes and constant problems with the aging westbound structure, MODOT started studies for a new replacement around 2001 or 2002. Funding was finally unveiled in 2011, and in November, 2012 a design-build contract was awarded to the Walsh-Alberici joint venture team with designer Burns & McDonnell. Construction started in 2013 on a girder bridge, located upstream of the two existing bridges. All four eastbound lanes were routed onto the new bridge on June 28, 2015. The new bridge also features a bike/pedestrian attachment, which connects the Katy Trail to the Monarch Levee Trail.

See also
 
 
 
 List of crossings of the Missouri River

References

Bridges in Greater St. Louis
U.S. Route 40
Bridges in St. Louis County, Missouri
Bridges in St. Charles County, Missouri
Bridges completed in 1937
Bridges completed in 1988
Bridges on the Interstate Highway System
Bridges of the United States Numbered Highway System
Road bridges in Missouri
Interstate 64
U.S. Route 61
Girder bridges in the United States
Continuous truss bridges in the United States